Klaus Rost (born 2 March 1940) is a retired German lightweight wrestler. He competed in freestyle wrestling at the 1964, 1968 and 1972 Olympics and won a silver medal in 1964. In Greco-Roman wrestling he won a bronze medal at the 1963 World Championships, and finished fourth at the 1968 Olympics and 1969 World Championships.

References

External links
 

1940 births
Living people
Olympic wrestlers of the United Team of Germany
Olympic wrestlers of West Germany
Wrestlers at the 1964 Summer Olympics
Wrestlers at the 1968 Summer Olympics
Wrestlers at the 1972 Summer Olympics
German male sport wrestlers
Olympic silver medalists for the United Team of Germany
Olympic medalists in wrestling
World Wrestling Championships medalists
Medalists at the 1964 Summer Olympics
People from Witten
Sportspeople from Arnsberg (region)
20th-century German people
21st-century German people